Harvey Lee Bradbury (born 29 December 1998) is an English professional footballer who plays for Dartford on loan from Dorchester Town as a forward.

He began his career at Portsmouth and spent time on loan at Havant & Waterlooville, before being signed by Watford in 2017. He spent the second half of the 2017–18 season on loan at St Albans City and joined Hungerford Town on loan in July 2018. He signed with Oxford United the next month and returned to Hungerford Town on loan. He was loaned to Woking in September 2018 and made his debut for Oxford in the Football League two months later. He rejoined Woking on loan for the second half of the 2018–19 season and helped the club to win promotion out of the National League South via the play-offs. He signed with Millwall in July 2019 and spent the second half of the 2019–20 season on loan at Morecambe.

Following his departure from Millwall, Bradbury subsequently had spells in non-league with Oxford City, Welling United, Gosport Borough and Dorchester Town.

Early and personal life
Bradbury's father Lee was also a footballer. Both played at Oxford United during their careers, the first father and son to have played for the club.

Career

Portsmouth
Bradbury began his career with Portsmouth and had a loan spell with Havant & Waterlooville during the 2016–17 season. He played one Isthmian League Premier Division game for the "Hawks" in the 2016–17 season. He scored 14 goals in 26 youth level games for "Pompey", including one goal against Manchester City in the FA Youth Cup, though never made a first-team appearance at Fratton Park.

Watford
He joined the under-23 squad at Premier League side Watford, initially on a trial basis, in May 2017. On 5 January 2018, he moved on loan to St Albans City until the end of the 2017–18 season, having impressed manager Ian Allinson in a pre-season friendly. He made his debut the following day in a 2–1 win over Chelmsford City at Clarence Park. On 20 January, he was sent off for after receiving two yellow cards in a 1–1 draw at Eastbourne Borough. He scored his first career goal on 17 March, in a 2–1 victory at Concord Rangers.

Oxford United
He returned to the National League South on loan at Hungerford Town in July 2018 and scored on his debut in a 3–2 defeat at former club St Albans City on 4 August. Three days later he signed for Oxford United under-23's on a free transfer, and continued his loan at Hungerford Town. He scored a total of two goals in eight games for the "Crusaders". He then moved on loan to Woking, also of the National League South, in September 2018. He scored on his debut for the "Cardinals" in a 2–1 defeat to Dulwich Hamlet at Kingfield Stadium on 15 September. The following week he scored a hat-trick in a 4–0 victory over Tooting & Mitcham United in the FA Cup Second Qualifying Round. He returned to Oxford and manager Karl Robinson gave him his senior debut on 6 November 2018, in a 3–0 victory at Wycombe Wanderers in the EFL Trophy. He made his Football League debut 11 days later, coming on as a 56th-minute substitute for Sam Smith in a 1–0 win over Gillingham at the Kassam Stadium. After those two first-team appearances for Oxford, he returned on loan to Woking for the rest of the 2018–19 season on 4 January. He scored six goals in 21 games for Woking in the 2018–19 season, including a late appearance as a substitute for Jake Hyde in the play-off final victory over Welling United that secured promotion into the National League. He was released by Oxford at the end of the 2018–19 season.

Millwall
Bradbury signed for Championship club Millwall. He was a regular in Kevin Nugent's under-23 team. On 31 January 2020, he moved on loan to League Two club Morecambe until the end of the 2019–20 season. He was released by Millwall at the end of the 2019–20 season. He began training with Port Vale in August 2020.

Return to non-league
In August 2020 he signed for Oxford City. On 2 April 2022, Bradbury signed for National League South side Welling United.

On 27 June 2022, Bradbury agreed to join Gosport Borough ahead of the 2022–23 campaign. He moved to Dorchester Town in October 2022.

On 10 March 2023, Bradbury joined Dartford until the end of the 2022–23 season.

Career statistics

Honours
Woking
National League South play-offs: 2018–19

References

1998 births
Living people
English footballers
Association football forwards
Portsmouth F.C. players
Havant & Waterlooville F.C. players
Watford F.C. players
St Albans City F.C. players
Hungerford Town F.C. players
Oxford United F.C. players
Woking F.C. players
Millwall F.C. players
Morecambe F.C. players
Oxford City F.C. players
Welling United F.C. players
Gosport Borough F.C. players
Isthmian League players
National League (English football) players
English Football League players
Dorchester Town F.C. players
Dartford F.C. players